Kalyan Junction is a major railway junction station on the central line of the Mumbai Suburban Railway network, lying at the junction of the north-east and south-east lines of the suburban Mumbai division of the Central Railway,  north-east of Mumbai. It comes under top 10 busiest railway junction in India.

Kalyan junction will get 6 new platforms under yard remodeling project. The land for this project is available in railway goods yard on eastern side of railway station. This project will ensure separation of suburban and local train operations.

One of the oldest and important railway project of Ahmednagar railway station was Kalyan-Ahmednagar railway project which was in planning stage since british regime. It was referred  as 3rd ghat project. The survey of this project was carried out in 1973,2000, 2006, 2014 etc. This project was in pink book in 2010. This project could not be started. The alignment length of thus project was 184 km and it could have been shortest route for marathwada, andhra and telangana. The major challenge for this project is 18.96 km long tunnel Malshej ghat section. 
Malshej Kriti samiti is following for Kalyan-Ahmednagar railway project. Kalyan-Murbad section which is first phase of this project is already under survey stage. 

Towards Kasara and Khopoli, Kalyan Junction is the last station at which fast services stop i.e all services running from Chhatrapati Shivaji Terminus to Kasara or Khopoli start halting at all stops beyond Kalyan. The same is true for when the trains are running towards C.S.M.T, with Kalyan being the first fast stop.

Infrastructure
There are 7 platforms at Kalyan Jn. Platform 2&3, 4&5 and 6&7 share a common platform base. Platform 4,5,6,7 serves for Express trains. Platform 5 serves for all Chhatrapati Shivaji Maharaj Terminus-bound Fast local trains where Platform 4 serves for all Khopoli/Kasara bound Fast local trains. Majority of trains towards Nashik side from Chhatrapati Shivaji Maharaj Terminus stops at platform no. 4.

Platform 1 and Platform 1A are dedicated to local trains that start from Kalyan and go to CSMT.

Loco Sheds

The Kalyan Electric Loco Shed and Kalyan Diesel Loco Shed are also located nearby. They are the lone sheds serving Mumbai region.

1991 Train bomb blast 
On November 8, 1991, a bomb exploded on a train when it reached Kalyan railway station. Twelve people were killed and 65 injured in the explosion. Ravinder Singh alias Bittu who was linked to the Babbar Khalsa, a Sikh militant organization was convicted in the case.

References

External links
 

Railway junction stations in Maharashtra
Mumbai CST-Kalyan rail line
Kalyan-Igatpuri rail line
Kalyan-Lonavala rail line
Railway stations in Thane district
Transport in Kalyan-Dombivli
Mumbai CR railway division
Mumbai Suburban Railway stations
Year of establishment missing
Indian Railway A1 Category Stations